Sean Rash (born  August 22, 1982) is an American ten-pin bowler who is considered one of the top players on the Professional Bowlers Association (PBA) Tour. He currently owns 17 PBA Tour titles, including two major championships, and was the 2011–12 PBA Player of the Year. Rash has rolled two of his 30 career PBA perfect 300 games on television, making him the first player in history with multiple perfect games in the TV finals of a PBA Tour event. Canadian François Lavoie and American Chris Via, and Australian Jason  Belmonte have since joined Rash in this exclusive club. Sean also owns ten PBA Regional Tour titles.

As of January 2020, Rash is a member of the 900 Global and Vise Grips pro staffs, being previously sponsored by Brunswick for 17 years.

Before the PBA
Sean Rash was a highly accomplished bowler before turning pro. His amateur accomplishments included:
 Junior Team USA member in 1998, 2002 and 2003.
 Team USA member in 2002, 2004 and 2005. Was part of the 2004 team that won the World Tenpin Team Cup in The Netherlands.
 Two-time All-American at Wichita State University (2002 and 2003).
 Won the 2003 International Bowling Congress (IBC) National Championship, and was runner-up for IBC Bowler of the Year.
 Won the 2003 USBC Doubles Championship, where he and partner Derek Sapp established an all-time record for pinfall with 1,540 over six games (later broken in 2007 by Jonathan Masur and Jeffrey Butler shooting a 1,544).
 Bowled as an amateur in the 2003 USBC Masters, his first-ever PBA Tour event, and finished seventh.

Rash also started a tournament in his native Alaska when he was just 13 years old. Frustrated by a lack of scratch tournaments for junior bowlers, he started his own: Sean Rash Stars of the Future.  The tournament is in its 18th year as of 2012, and has awarded nearly $25,000 in scholarship money over the years.

PBA career

Early years

Rash joined the PBA Tour in 2005. He holds the distinction of being the first PBA player to ever win a title when starting from the Tour Qualifying Round (TQR), which he accomplished in his rookie season at the 2006 West Virginia Championship. He won his first PBA major title at the 2007 USBC Masters in Milwaukee, Wisconsin. The win gave Rash four titles in his first four television appearances, and seven straight match wins on TV to open his career (one short of the record eight wins set by George Branham III).  The streak ended when Rash lost to Norm Duke in the semi-final match of the 2008–09 season-opening PBA World Championship.

2011–12: PBA Player of the Year
Rash won the 2012 PBA Tournament of Champions for his first championship in five years, and second major title overall. Qualifying as the #1 seed, Rash beat Ryan Ciminelli in the final match 239–205. Rash led the 2011–12 PBA Tour in average, earnings and points. On May 28, 2012, the PBA announced that Rash had won the 2012 Chris Schenkel PBA Player of the Year award in an extremely close vote (Rash received 29% of the vote to Jason Belmonte's 26.6%).

2012–13: International success
Sean won his sixth and seventh PBA Tour titles in the 2012–13 season, in the WBT Kuwait Open and WBT Thailand Open. He later won an additional $20,000 in the World Bowling Tour finals (contested at the 2013 World Series of Bowling), but this did not count as a PBA title. Sean was the top money winner on Tour for the 2012–13 season, with earnings of $248,317.

2014: First televised 300 game
In the finals of the PBA Wolf Open on May 24, 2014 (broadcast nationally on June 3, 2014), Sean rolled the PBA's 23rd televised 300 game in the opening match.  He went on to win the tournament for his 8th PBA title.

2015: Second televised 300 game
This, combined with his June 2014 perfect game, made him the only player in PBA history to have bowled two televised perfect games in PBA Tour events. He did not, however, go on to win the tournament. On October 11, 2015, Rash bowled from the #1 seed position and defeated Hall of Famer Pete Weber in a single-game final to win the PBA Xtra Frame Iowa Midwest Open for his ninth PBA title.

Sean passed the $1 million mark in career PBA earnings during the 2015 season.

2016: 10-title plateau
Rash won his 10th PBA title at the PBA Fall Swing Badger Open on September 10, 2016 in Allen Park, Michigan, defeating #1 qualifier Wes Malott in the final match. One day later, Rash won his 11th title in the PBA Detroit Open, defeating top seed Jason Belmonte in the final match.

2017
As one of the top eight money leaders from the start of the 2015 season through the 2017 USBC Masters, Rash was invited to participate in the inaugural Main Event PBA Tour Finals in May, 2017. He placed sixth in the event. On August 20, 2017, Rash won his 12th PBA Tour title at the Xtra Frame Gene Carter's Pro Shop Classic in Middletown, Delaware, defeating reigning PBA Player of the Year E. J. Tackett in the final match.

2018
Rash endured his most difficult season to date in 2018, advancing to match play in only 10 of 30 events and making only one championship round appearance.

2019
On January 13, 2019, Rash won his 13th PBA title, teaming with partner Matt Ogle to take the top prize in the Roth-Holman PBA Doubles Championship. Rash qualified as the #6 seed for the inaugural PBA Tour Playoffs. He made it to the Final Four on June 1, but lost in the semifinal to Bill O'Neill. Rash won his second title of 2019 and 14th overall on August 27 at the PBA Wolf Open. Qualifying as the #3 seed, Rash defeated Kyle Troup in his first match, then rolled back-to-back 257 games against #2 qualifier Norm Duke and top seed Anthony Simonsen to earn the championship. Rash was also recognized as the USBC Cup champion for earning the most points during the nine-event 2019 PBA Summer Swing, which awarded him a $20,000 bonus. He qualified as the #1 seed at the 2019 U.S. Open, but finished runner-up to champion François Lavoie. Rash also won the non-title 2019 PBA China Tiger Cup on November 21, sweeping A.J. Johnson 211–194 and 227–207 in the best-two-of-three final to take the $20,000 top prize.

2020
On January 26, 2020, Rash won his 15th PBA Tour title at the PBA Oklahoma Open. He qualified as the #5 seed for the stepladder finals and won all four matches to win the title, defeating Packy Hanrahan, Jesper Svensson, Brad Miller, and top seed Ryan Ciminelli. On June 13, 2020, Rash won the PBA Summer Clash, a non-title made-for-TV event held in Jupiter, Florida. Rash outlasted nine other competitors in the one-ball elimination tournament, surviving two sudden-death tie-breakers on his way to defeating Bill O'Neill in the ninth and final round. On October 4, 2020, Rash won the PBA World Series of Bowling XI Cheetah Championship held in Centreville, Virginia. (Qualifying rounds were held in Las Vegas in March, after which the event was postponed due to the COVID-19 pandemic.) As the #3 seed for the finals, he defeated Darren Tang, Packy Hanrahan, and top seed E. J. Tackett to claim his 16th PBA Tour title. This was Rash's first title in a World Series of Bowling event after 15 previous final round appearances, which included four runner-up finishes.

Rash surpassed the $1.5 million mark in career earnings during the 2020 season. He has accumulated 30 perfect 300 games in PBA events to date (end of 2019 season).

2021
On August 22, 2021 (his 39th birthday), Rash won his 17th PBA Tour title at the PBA Chesapeake Open, defeating Tom Daugherty in the final match.

2022
In the opening event of the 2022 season, the PBA Players Championship, Rash won the Midwest Region final over Matt Russo. During the final match, Rash openly questioned the "integrity" of urethane bowling ball use on the PBA Tour, due to his rather well-known disapproval of urethane bowling balls – mostly the Purple Hammer, which has had controversy surrounding its softness. He also uttered an expletive on the live broadcast during his rant. He was fined an undisclosed amount, forced to miss one February event (later announced as the Dave Small's Best of the Best Championship), and was placed on one year probation by the PBA for "conduct unbecoming a professional". Rash went on to claim the No. 1 seed for the January 29 Players Championship finals, but fell to No. 2 seed Jason Belmonte in the final match.

2023
Early in the 2023 season, Rash announced he has been diagnosed with a degenerative disc disease, but still wants to continue bowling as much as treatment options will allow.

PBA Titles
Major titles in boldface.

 2005–06 West Virginia Open (Parkersburg, WV)
 2006–07 Beltway Classic (Baltimore, MD)
 2006–07 Earl Anthony Medford Classic (Medford, OR)
 2007–08 USBC Masters (Milwaukee, WI)
 2011–12 PBA Tournament of Champions (Las Vegas, NV)
 2012–13 WBT Kuwait Open (Kuwait City)
 2012–13 WBT Thailand Open (Bangkok)
 2014 PBA Wolf Open (Shawnee, OK)
 2015 PBA Xtra Frame Iowa Midwest Open (Council Bluffs, IA)
 2016 PBA Badger Open (Allen Park, MI)
 2016 PBA Detroit Open (Allen Park, MI)
 2017 Storm Xtra Frame Gene Carter's Pro Shop Classic (Middletown, DE)
 2019 Roth-Holman PBA Doubles Championship w/Matt Ogle (Shawnee, OK)
 2019 FloBowling PBA Wolf Open (Aurora, IL)
 2020 PBA Oklahoma Open (Shawnee, OK)
 2020 PBA WSOB XI Cheetah Championship (Las Vegas, NV and Centreville, VA)
 2021 PBA Chesapeake Open (Chesapeake, VA)

Career statistics
Statistics are through the last complete PBA season.

+ CRA=Championship Round Appearances

Personal
Rash was born in Denver, Colorado. At the age of 6 months, he and his family moved to Anchorage, Alaska, where he would live until he was 18 years old. He then attended Wichita State University in Wichita, Kansas. He now resides in Montgomery, Illinois, with his wife Sara and their three daughters.

Sources
 www.pba.com, official site of the Professional Bowlers Association and Lumber Liquidators PBA Tour
 http://www.bowl.com/tournaments/usbcopen/national/records_general_records.aspx

References

American ten-pin bowling players
Sportspeople from Anchorage, Alaska
Sportspeople from Illinois
1982 births
Living people